Sandes is a surname. People with the surname include:

 Arthur Sandes (1793–1832), British commanding officer of Rifle Battalions
 Carlos Matías Sandes (born 1984), Argentine-Italian professional basketball player
 Flora Sandes (1876–1956), British woman, served as officer, Royal Serbian Army in World War I
 Elise Sandes (1861–1934), Irish founder of welfare movement for soldiers
 John Sandes (1863–1938), Australian journalist and author
 Rafael Sandes (born 1987), Brazilian goalkeeper
 Ryan Sandes (born 1982), South African trail runner
 The Right Rev. Stephen Sandes (died 1842), Church of Ireland bishop
 Victor Sandes (born 1992), Brazilian footballer

See also
 Major Arthur Fleming-Sandes (1894–1961), English recipient of the Victoria Cross
 Sandes (disambiguation)